Crotalus ericsmithi, commonly known as the Guerreran long-tailed rattlesnake, is a species of venomous snake of the family Viperidae. The species is indigenous to southeastern Mexico.

Etymology
The specific name, ericsmithi, is in honor of American herpetologist Eric N. Smith.

Geographic range
C. ericsmithi is endemic to the Mexican state of Guerrero.

Habitat

Distinguishing characteristics
Compared to most other rattlesnakes, C. ericsmithi has an unusually long tail with a very small rattle.

Reproduction
C. ericsmithi is ovoviviparous.

References

Further reading
Campbell JA, Flores-Villela O (2008). "A New Long-Tailed Rattlesnake (Viperidae) from Guerrero, Mexico". Herpetologica 64 (2): 246–257. (Crotalus ericsmithi, new species).
Heimes P (2016). Snakes of Mexico: Herpetofauna Mexicana Vol. I. Frankfurt am Main, Germany: Chimaira. 572 pp. .
Palacios-Aguilar R, Flores-Villela O (2018). "An updated checklist of the herpetofauna from Guerrero, Mexico". Zootaxa 4422: 1–24.
Reyes-Velasco J, Meik JM, Smith EN, Castoe TA (2013). "Phylogenetic relationships of the enigmatic longtailed [sic] rattlesnakes (Crotalus ericsmithi, C. lannomi, and C. stejnegeri)". Molecular Phylogenetics and Evolution 69 (3): 524–534.

ericsmithi
Snakes of North America
Endemic reptiles of Mexico
Reptiles described in 2008
Taxa named by Jonathan A. Campbell